Qanqoli-ye Sofla (also Romanized as Qānqolī-ye Soflá and Qānqolī Soflá; also known as Kahlā-ye Soflā, Kānghuli, Kānghūli Sifta, Kanguli-Sifta, Qānqolī, Qānqolī Chāy-ye Pā’īn, and Qānqolī-ye Pā’īn) is a village in Ab Bar Rural District, in the Central District of Tarom County, Zanjan Province, Iran. At the 2006 census, its population was 271, in 68 families.

References 

Populated places in Tarom County